

T

U 

 

T